Rove LA is  an Australian television comedy talk show which debuted on Fox8 on 19 September 2011. The show is hosted by Rove McManus and is set in Los Angeles. The show is presented in a similar fashion to McManus's previous talk show Rove, featuring comedy segments and interviews with celebrity guests. The show was picked up for a two-year run on the Fox8 subscription channel.

Season 3 did not air in 2013, but producers speculated that there may be a season 3 possibly later on; however, as of 2022, this has not eventuated.

History

Rove LA began on the Fox8 cable network in September 2011 as a platform for McManus to return to Australian television. The concept of the show being Rove reporting each week in pre-recorded episodes from Los Angeles, which fit with McManus's current residency in the United States while still having a presence on Australian television. The series was picked up for a 10-episode run for 2011 on the network as a means to test the new show's reception with audiences.

The series was officially renewed for 2012 with the expectation of a longer season run. Rove LA was renewed for a second 13-episode season that premiered on 30 September 2012. The series was picked up by the TV Guide Network for broadcast in the United States.

Format
Similar to McManus' former show Rove, the show starts with Rove performing a comedic monologue about a variety of topics and events, usually covering American culture. He then introduces his guests one by one on 'The Couch', engaging them in conversations led by various segments such as the "Getting to Know You" and "Random Question Hat". Unlike McManus' previous show, Rove is the only cast member of the show. However, since episode 10 of season 2, Gary Busey has made a guest appearance in each episode as a "Stand-in Guest in case something goes wrong with one of the guests". The show is also notable for allowing its guests to swear on television.

International distribution
Rove LA was broadcast primarily on its Australian cable broadcaster network FOX8. Repeat episodes air on both Fox8 and Australian network The Comedy Channel. It can also be seen in the United States on The TV Guide Network.

References

External links

Fox8 original programming
Australian television talk shows
2011 Australian television series debuts
2012 Australian television series endings
English-language television shows
Television shows set in Los Angeles